The Vision class is a group of six cruise ships built by Royal Caribbean International, and operated by themselves and Marella Cruises. Although called a class by Royal Caribbean, the Vision-class ships were built as three pairs of sister ships, each pair differing from the others in size and design. Unlike other Royal Caribbean classes, the Vision class is not named for the first ship built;  was the last ship in the class to be built. Royal Caribbean had been promoting "Project Vision" for some time before ordering the first two ships in the class in 1992, but Vision of the Seas was not ordered until 1994.

Vision-class ships were designed to have more glass windows than any other ships at the time they debuted, and therefore greater views of the oceans from interior spaces. Ships in the Vision class were also the fastest built in 25 years thanks to their diesel-electric propulsion systems (the first in the Royal Caribbean fleet), which allowed the larger engines to be placed closer to the middle of the ships for better weight balance.

Two of the ships were built at Kvaerner Masa-Yards, Helsinki New Shipyard, Finland, while the others were built at Chantiers de l'Atlantique, St. Nazaire, France.

Ships

References

Cruise ship classes
Royal Caribbean International